The 2020 Dallas Wings season was the franchise's 23rd season in the Women's National Basketball Association (WNBA) and the 5th season for the franchise in Dallas. The regular season started on July 26, 2020, versus the Atlanta Dream. This will be the second season under head coach Brian Agler.

This WNBA season will have an all-time high 36 regular-season games. However, the plan for expanded games was put on hold on April 3, when the WNBA postponed its season due to the COVID-19 pandemic. Under a plan approved on June 15, the league is scheduled to hold a shortened 22-game regular season at IMG Academy, without fans present, starting on July 24.

The Wings started the season strongly, winning two of their first three games. The season then took a downward turn when the team had two separate three game losing streaks, separated by only one win. Dallas finished August 3–3 to arrive at a 6–10 overall record. The team went 2–4 in September, but ended the season with a win. A bright spot for the team was Arike Ogunbowale, who lead the WNBA in scoring and was named to the All-WNBA First Team.

Transactions

WNBA draft 
The Wings will make the following selections in the 2020 WNBA Draft.

Trades and roster changes

Roster

Game log

Regular season

|- style="background:#fcc;"
| 1
| July 26
| Atlanta Dream
| 95–105
| Ogunbowale (19)
| Harrison (10)
| Sabally (5)
| IMG Academy
| 0–1
|- style="background:#bbffbb;"
| 2
| July 29
| New York Liberty
| W 93–80
| Ogunbowale (20)
| Tied (6)
| 3 tied (4)
| IMG Academy
| 1–1
|- style="background:#bbffbb;"
| 3
| July 31
| Indiana Fever
| W 76–73
| Sabally (23)
| Sabally (17)
| Harris (5)
| IMG Academy
| 2–1

|- style="background:#fcc;"
| 4
| August 2
| Las Vegas Aces
| L 70–79
| Ogunbowale (20)
| Tied (6)
| Jefferson (3)
| IMG Academy
| 2–2
|- style="background:#fcc;"
| 5
| August 4
| Chicago Sky
| L 79–82
| Ogunbowale (26)
| Alarie (9)
| Ogunbowale (5)
| IMG Academy
| 2–3
|- style="background:#fcc;"
| 6
| August 6
| Connecticut Sun
| L 68–91
| Ogunbowale (17)
| Harrison (9)
| Harris (7)
| IMG Academy
| 2–4
|- style="background:#bbffbb;"
| 7
| August 8
| Atlanta Dream
| W 85–75
| Ogunbowale (24)
| Jefferson (10)
| Ogunbowale (6)
| IMG Academy
| 3–4
|- style="background:#fcc;"
| 8
| August 10
| Phoenix Mercury
| L 79–91
| Ogunbowale (22)
| Sabally (10)
| Harrison (4)
| IMG Academy
| 3–5
|- style="background:#fcc;"
| 9
| August 12
| Connecticut Sun
| L 66–70
| Ogunbowale (19)
| Sabally (9)
| Sabally (3)
| IMG Academy
| 3–6
|- style="background:#fcc;"
| 10
| August 14
| Seattle Storm
| L 65–83
| Ogunbowale (22)
| Ndour (8)
| Mabrey (4)
| IMG Academy
| 3–7
|- style="background:#bbffbb;"
| 11
| August 16
| Phoenix Mercury
| W 95–89
| Ogunbowale (33)
| Gray (7)
| Samuelson (4)
| IMG Academy
| 4–7
|- style="background:#fcc;"
| 12
| August 19
| Minnesota Lynx
| L 84–91
| Gray (22)
| Thornton (11)
| Mabrey (5)
| IMG Academy
| 4–8
|- style="background:#bbffbb;"
| 13
| August 21
| Washington Mystics
| W 101–92
| Ogunbowale (24)
| Thornton (10)
| Ogunbowale (9)
| IMG Academy
| 5–8
|- style="background:#fcc;"
| 14
| August 23
| Los Angeles Sparks
| L 81–84
| Ogunbowale (20)
| Sabally (9)
| Ogunbowale (5)
| IMG Academy
| 5–9
|- style="background:#fcc;"
| 15
| August 25
| Las Vegas Aces
| L 92–96
| Ogunbowale (21)
| Sabally (11)
| Tied (5)
| IMG Academy
| 5–10
|- style="background:#bbffbb;"
| 16
| August 29
| Indiana Fever
| W 82–78
| Ogunbowale (30)
| Sabally (11)
| Tied (4)
| IMG Academy
| 6–10

|- style="background:#fcc;"
| 17
| September 2
| Los Angeles Sparks
| L 83–91
| Ogunbowale (17)
| Sabally (11)
| Ogunbowale (5)
| IMG Academy
| 6–11
|- style="background:#fcc;"
| 18
| September 4
| Minnesota Lynx
| L 75–88
| Gray (26)
| Sabally (6)
| Mabrey (5)
| IMG Academy
| 6–12
|- style="background:#bbffbb;"
| 19
| September 6
| Washington Mystics
| W 101–94 (OT)
| Ogunbowale (39)
| Sabally (6)
| Ogunbowale (4)
| IMG Academy
| 7–12
|- style="background:#fcc;"
| 20
| September 9
| Seattle Storm
| L 95–107
| Sabally (25)
| Sabally (7)
| Harris (5)
| IMG Academy
| 7–13
|- style="background:#fcc;"
| 21
| September 11
| Chicago Sky
| L 88–95
| Ogunbowale (38)
| Ndour (7)
| Mabrey (7)
| IMG Academy
| 7–14
|- style="background:#bbffbb;"
| 22
| September 13
| New York Liberty
| W 82–79
| Ogunbowale (26)
| Thornton (10)
| Harris (5)
| IMG Academy
| 8–14

Standings

Statistics

Regular season
Source:

Awards and honors

References

External links 
 Official website of the Dallas Wings

Dallas Wings
Dallas Wings seasons
Dallas Wings